The Pro-Park New Party ( Chin Bak Sindang; sometimes translated as the New Pro-Park Party) is a South Korean political party led by Hong Moon-jong.

History 
The party was formed by Hong Moon-jong, an MP for Uijeongbu 2nd constituency elected under the Saenuri Party banner in 2012 election. He remained within the party after the party changed its name to Liberty Korea Party, however, when the Korean Patriots' Party (KPP) was formed by Cho Won-jin, he frequently attended to protests organised by the KPP.

On 15 June 2019, Hong announced his withdrawal from the LKP and officially exited 2 days later. Prior to his withdrawal, he was already elected as the co-Presidents of the KPP and later the party changed its name to the Our Republican Party (ORP). Nevertheless, both soon faced conflicts and on 10 February 2020, Hong was removed from the ORP.

On 25 February, the Pro-Park New Party was officially established and Hong was elected as its new leader. For the upcoming general election, he proposed an electoral alliance with the Liberty Unification Party and the other nonpartisan pro-Park Geun-hye figures i.e. Byun Hui-jae.

Hanjin Lew, PNP's Spokesperson for International Affairs, explained the PNP's foundation, its political philosophy and international relations during an interview with One Korea News Network - Hawaii.

U.S.-Japan-RoK Tripartite Alliance

The PNP is a staunch supporter of the U.S.-Japan-RoK tripartite alliance. The party's famous pro-US stance was visible when several MPs criticized that U.S. Ambassador Harry B. Harris Jr. was rude, Hong defended Ambassador Harris saying that he was in no way rude to him.

President Park Geun-hye

In an interview with Japan Forward, Sankei Shimbun's English Newspaper, spokesman Lew explained the inherent link between human rights and international security and called for immediate release of President Park Geun-hye to safeguard freedom of the South, Japan and the U.S.

References

2020 establishments in South Korea
Anti-communism in South Korea
Anti-communist parties
Conservative parties in South Korea
Far-right politics in South Korea
National conservative parties
Political parties established in 2020
Political parties in South Korea
Right-wing populism in South Korea
Right-wing populist parties